Jurandvor is a village in Croatia, just to the north of Baška. It is connected by the D102 highway.

The historic Church of St. Lucy, Jurandvor is located in the village.

References

Populated places in Primorje-Gorski Kotar County
Krk